The auricular branch of the vagus nerve is often termed the Alderman's nerve or Arnold's nerve. The latter name is an eponym for Friedrich Arnold. The auricular branch of the vagus nerve supplies sensory innervation to the skin of the ear canal, tragus, and auricle.

Path
It arises from the superior ganglion of the vagus nerve, and is joined soon after its origin by a filament from the petrous ganglion of the glossopharyngeal; it passes behind the internal jugular vein, and enters the mastoid canaliculus on the lateral wall of the jugular fossa.

The nerve reaches the surface by passing through the tympanomastoid fissure between the mastoid process and the tympanic part of the temporal bone, and divides into two branches: 
 one joins the posterior auricular nerve.
 the other is distributed to the skin of the back of the ear (auricle) and to the posterior part of the ear canal.

Clinical significance
This nerve may be involved by the glomus jugulare tumour.

Laryngeal cancer can present with pain behind the ear and in the ear - this is a referred pain through the vagus nerve to the nerve of Arnold.

In a small portion of individuals, the auricular nerve is the afferent limb of the Ear-Cough or Arnold Reflex.  Physical stimulation of the external acoustic meatus innervated by the auricular nerve elicits a cough, much like the other cough reflexes associated with the vagus nerve. Rarely, on introduction of speculum in the external ear, patients have experienced syncope due to the stimulation of the auricular branch of the vagus nerve.

Clinical application
This nerve may be stimulated as a diagnostic or therapeutic technique

Transcutaneous vagus nerve stimulation (tVNS) was proposed by Ventureya (2000) for seizures. In 2003 Fallgatter et al. published "Far field potentials from the brain stem after transcutaneous vagus nerve stimulation" and in 2007 Kraus et al. did the first tVNS-fMRI study. In Europe, a device was approved for seizure treatment (NEMOS by CerboMed). Although the transcutaneous method has not been specifically approved in the United States (i.e. off-label) it is legal and being investigated (and found to be effective and safe) for many conditions including:

 Atrial fibrillation 
 Depression 
 Diabetes 
 Endotoxemia 
 Memory 
 Myocardial infarction 
 Tinnitus
 Stroke

References

External links
 Diagram

Vagus nerve
Nerves of the head and neck